Mariya Milovidova (born December 7, 1982) is a Ukrainian fashion designer based in the United States. She is the founder of Mariya Milovidova Art and Fashion. Milovidova is also member of the San Francisco Fashion and Merchants Alliance.

Early life and education 
Milovidova was born in Odessa, Ukraine in 1982. She attended the Grekov School of Art. Later Milovidova moved to San Francisco Bay Area and joined San Jose State University for a Bachelor's degree in Art & Textile Design.

Career 
Milovidova started her career as fashion designer when she moved to United States from Ukraine. In September 2014, Her Stardust Silk Art gown with LEDs which was photographed by Bill Cunningham at Lincoln Center during New York Fashion Week was featured in The New York Times.

In March 2019, Milovidova showcased her Asian-inspired visuals at "Dragon's Lounge”, an event organized by Creative Startup Labs. In February 14, 2020, Milovidova appeared as one of the participants in "The Artist as Curator", a selection for Senator Scott Wiener's office at the California State building in San Francisco. Her designed dresses were worn by Miss California, Miss Catherine Liang, Miss Nevada Kataluna Enriquez and others.

In 2021, Milovidova worked as a fashion designer for the fashion film Gold-In You San Francisco. The film was directed by Ezra J Stanley of AboveGrey Pictures. 

Milovidova has participated in fashion and art shows including the De Young Museum Fashion Show dedicated to Jean Paul Gautier, the EcoVVear Fashion Show, and San Francisco Fashion Week. Milovidova's designed dresses have been featured in Los Angeles, Paris and New York.

Awards

References

External links 
 

1982 births
Living people
Ukrainian fashion designers